The 82nd running of the Tour of Flanders cycling race in Belgium was held on Sunday 5 April 1998. Belgian Johan Museeuw won his third victory in the monument classic. The race started in Bruges for the first time and finished in Meerbeke (Ninove).

Course
Johan Museeuw broke clear from a select group on Tenbosse, a climb in Brakel at 26 km from the finish. Peter Van Petegem, realizing the danger, counterattacked, but was caught again. Museeuw powered on over the Muur and Bosberg to the finish, while his Mapei team controlled the race with three riders in the pursuit group. His team mate Zanini won the sprint for second place before Andrei Tchmil. Museeuw became the fourth rider to win the Tour of Flanders three times, equalling the race record of Achiel Buysse, Fiorenzo Magni and Eric Leman.

Climbs
There were fifteen categorized climbs:

Results

External links
 Recap of the race on Flemish television

References

Tour of Flanders
Tour of Flanders
Tour of Flanders
Tour Of Flanders
April 1998 sports events in Europe